Tiarks may refer to:

 Frank Cyril Tiarks, British banker
 Geoffrey Lewis Tiarks, Bishop of Maidstone, England
 Henrietta Joan Tiarks, Dowager Duchess of Bedford, England
 Johann Ludwig Tiarks, German astronomer in British service, who surveyed the Canada–United States border in the 19th century
 John Tiarks, Anglican churchman